Sherwood High School is a public high school in Sherwood, Oregon, United States. The school competes in the 6A Oregon School Activities Association Pacific Conference.

Background

History
Sherwood High School underwent major renovations beginning in 2007. Additions include remodeling, new classrooms, new baseball and soccer fields, as well as the Aaron J. Contreras Memorial Stadium, which is dedicated to Sherwood High Alumni Marine Capt. Aaron J. Contreras who died serving in the Iraq War. Projects were completed in 2009.

Academics
In 2015–2016, the school's four-year graduation rate was 89.82% and its five-year graduation rate was 95.17%. The state of Oregon's average graduation rates for that year were 74.83% (four-year) and 77.82 (five-year).

Aaron J. Contreras stadium

In 2004, the Sherwood High School stadium was renamed the Aaron J. Contreras Memorial Stadium. Contreras played football, basketball and baseball at Sherwood High School and later graduated from Embry-Riddle Aeronautical University in Prescott, Arizona, before joining the Marines. Captain Contreras died in 2003 while serving as a helicopter pilot on military duty in Iraq.

2016 Capital Bond 
In 2016, The Sherwood Schools 2016 Capital Bond announced plans to begin construction on a new high school. Once construction is complete, the new school will take the name Sherwood High School. Construction is ongoing as of September 2019, however planned opening is slated for the 2020–21 School Year.

Athletics
Sherwood High School's athletic teams are known as the Bowmen. Sherwood was reclassified as an OSAA 5A team as of the 2006-2007 school year after being in 3A for several years. The Sherwood Bowmen had a large rivalry with Wilsonville before moving to 6A in 2014.

State championships

Fall sports
 Football: 2010, 2012
 Girls' soccer: 2007, 2011, 2016
 Volleyball: 2010

Winter sports
 Boys' swimming: 2005, 2006
 Dance: 1994, 1998, 2006, 2023
 Girls' swimming: 2003, 2004, 2005, 2006
 Cheerleading: 1999

Spring sports
 Baseball: 1959, 1969, 2011, 2013

 Boys Track & Field: 2021(Covid Year)

Alumni
 Del Baker, baseball player, manager
 Jiggs Parrott, baseball player
 Tom Parrott, baseball player
 Bud Podbielan, baseball player
 Dave Edstrom, decathlete
 Chuck Sun, motocross
 Ilsa Paulson, (Class of 2006) runner
 Daniela Solis, (Class of 2011) Mexican-American footballer
 Adley Rutschman, (Class of 2016) MLB baseball player

References

External links
School profile

Educational institutions established in 1970
High schools in Washington County, Oregon
Public high schools in Oregon
Sherwood, Oregon
1970 establishments in Oregon